Ivan Gubijan (14 June 1923 – 4 January 2009) was a Yugoslav hammer thrower. He competed in the 1948 and 1952 Olympics and placed second and ninth, respectively. He is credited with introducing the four-turn throwing technique, which is widely used today.

References

External links 

 

1923 births
2009 deaths
Sportspeople from Bjelovar
Athletes (track and field) at the 1948 Summer Olympics
Athletes (track and field) at the 1952 Summer Olympics
Serbian male hammer throwers
Croatian male hammer throwers
Yugoslav male hammer throwers
Olympic athletes of Yugoslavia
Olympic silver medalists for Yugoslavia
Athletes from Belgrade
Medalists at the 1948 Summer Olympics
Olympic silver medalists in athletics (track and field)
Mediterranean Games silver medalists for Yugoslavia
Mediterranean Games medalists in athletics
Athletes (track and field) at the 1951 Mediterranean Games
History of Bjelovar